Yarengia is an extinct genus of temnospondyl amphibian in the superfamily Mastodonsauroidea. It is known from Yarenga River, representing the Triassic of Russia.

See also
 Prehistoric amphibian
 List of prehistoric amphibians

References

Stereospondyls
Triassic temnospondyls of Europe
Fossil taxa described in 1960